Newton is a town in Cache County, Utah, United States. It was founded in 1869 by pioneers of the Church of Jesus Christ of Latter-day Saints. The population was 789 at the 2010 census. It is included in the Logan, Utah-Idaho Metropolitan Statistical Area.

Geography
According to the United States Census Bureau, the town has a total area of 0.8 square mile (2.0 km2), all land.

History
Newton was first settled in 1869.  A bridge was built over the Bear River in 1871 and it was at that point that many of the inhabitants of Clarkston, Utah moved to this "new town".  Newton has two reservoirs nearby:  Newton Dam  reservoir to the north, and the much larger Cutler Reservoir to the south.

Demographics

As of the census of 2000, there were 699 people, 196 households, and 165 families residing in the town. The racial makeup of the town was 96.57% White, 2.29% Asian, 0.72% from other races, and 0.43% from two or more races. Hispanic or Latino of any race were 2.43% of the population.

There were 196 households, out of which 53.1% had children under the age of 18 living with them, 77.6% were married couples living together, 4.1% had a female householder with no husband present, and 15.8% were non-families. 13.3% of all households were made up of individuals, and 7.7% had someone living alone who was 65 years of age or older. The average household size was 3.57 and the average family size was 4.02.

In the town, the population was spread out, with 36.8% under the age of 18, 12.6% from 18 to 24, 22.0% from 25 to 44, 20.6% from 45 to 64, and 8.0% who were 65 years of age or older. The median age was 26 years. For every 100 females, there were 105.6 males. For every 100 females age 18 and over, there were 106.5 males.

The median income for a household in the town was $45,000, and the median income for a family was $47,875. Males had a median income of $31,957 versus $21,500 for females. The per capita income for the town was $13,146. None of the families and 0.7% of the population were living below the poverty line, including no under eighteens and 3.5% of those over 64.

Notable person
 Parley P. Christensen, Los Angeles City Council member

See also
 
 List of municipalities in Utah

References

External links

Towns in Cache County, Utah
Towns in Utah
Populated places established in 1869
Logan metropolitan area
1869 establishments in Utah Territory